Mummies Alive is a 2015 six-part television historical documentary series about mummies, that was shown on various networks, including  on Smithsonian Channel (US), History (Canada), Yesterday (UK), ZDF (Germany), and SBS One (Australia).  It was produced by Saloon Media and Impossible Factual, in association with Shaw Media. Directed by Mick Grogan and narrated by Jason Priestley, the six one-hour episodes center around mummies that have been found all around the world and the stories and legends surrounding their deaths.

Episodes
The Gunslinger Mummy
Buried in a Bog
Otzi the Iceman
The Inca Maiden
The Pharaoh's Secret
The Hero of Herculaneum

References

External links
http://www.saloonmedia.com/#!mummies-alive/cmpo
http://www.impossiblefactual.com/
http://www.smithsonianchannel.com/shows/mummies-alive/1003749
http://www.history.ca/mummies-alive/
http://www.history.ca/mummies-alive/episode-guide/
http://www.imdb.com/title/tt4718676/

2015 Canadian television series debuts
2010s Canadian reality television series